Emily's Reasons Why Not is a television series starring Heather Graham. The show, which was based on the novel of the same name by Carrie Gerlach, published in August 2004, was canceled by its broadcaster, ABC, after a single airing on January 9, 2006. The story revolves around Emily Sanders, a successful career woman in Los Angeles who has been unsuccessful dating. She seeks help from a therapist who recommends that Emily make a list of ten reasons why each of her dating relationships has failed.

The series premise centered on Emily (Graham), an editor of self-help books who is unable to find success in romance. In the premiere episode she ends a bad relationship and adopts a new rule for her romances: if she can list five reasons to break up with a guy, then she does so.  Emily gets help from her friends, among them Josh, whose character is strongly based on gay stereotypes. The show was widely considered a less risqué copycat of Sex and the City.

First episode
In the first episode, she is convinced that the man she was dating was gay when he was actually a devout Mormon practicing chastity before marriage.  His open virginity is presented through gay stereotypes, and his preferred sport, Brazilian jiu-jitsu is described as "the gayest sport there is" by Emily's former boyfriend.

Critical reception
It was reported that ABC committed to the show before seeing a script. Despite heavy promotion by both Sony Pictures Television and ABC, and a viewing average of 6.2 million viewers, the show was pulled after the first episode due to negative reception; production was stopped after filming six episodes. ABC was said to have spent millions on promotion, including airtime, billboards and radio ads, and considered Emily to be the "linchpin" of the network's post-football Monday-night schedule.  The promotion was so heavy and the cancellation so abrupt that some magazines found themselves carrying cover stories about a canceled show. After viewing it, ABC's entertainment president suggested that they considered the show lackluster and unlikely to improve. The New York Times attributed the cancellation in part to the extremely unappealing nature of the main character and the portrayal by Graham.

In 2006, all six episodes of the show aired on Spain's pay-TV channel Cosmopolitan under the title Cinco razones (para no salir contigo) ("Five Reasons (to not go out with you)"), on Sony Entertainment Television (Latin America), on ORF1 in Austria, and on POP TV in Slovenia.

Cast
 Emily Sanders (Heather Graham)
 Reilly Harvey (Nadia Dajani)
 Midas O'Shay (James Patrick Stuart)
 Josh (Khary Payton)
 Glitter Cho (Smith Cho)

Episodes

Home media
Emily's Reasons Why Not – The Complete Series was released on DVD on May 1, 2012. All six episodes produced were included in the set.

References

External links
 
 
 Washington Post article in which the programming chief at ABC discusses why the show was canceled and why it got as far as it did.

2006 American television series debuts
2006 American television series endings
2000s American single-camera sitcoms
American Broadcasting Company original programming
Television shows based on American novels
Television series by Sony Pictures Television
Television shows set in Los Angeles